Public Budgeting & Finance is a quarterly peer-reviewed academic journal published by Wiley-Blackwell on behalf of Public Financial Publications.  The journal was established in 1981 under Allen Schick, with the aim of integrating the interdependent but often separated fields of budgeting and financial management. The current editors-in-chief are Justin Marlowe (University of Washington) and Sharon Kioko (University of Washington). The journal spans the spectrum of budget process and policy and financial management.

References

External links 
 

Wiley-Blackwell academic journals
English-language journals
Publications established in 1981
Quarterly journals
Finance journals
Public administration journals